Carol Anderson (born June 17, 1959) is an American academic. She is the Charles Howard Candler professor of African American Studies at Emory University. Her research focuses on public policy with regard to race, justice, and equality.

Education
Anderson earned bachelor's and master's degrees at Miami University in Oxford, Ohio in 1981 and 1983, respectively. She earned a PhD in history from Ohio State University in 1995. She was awarded a fellowship to study at Harvard University in 2005, where she worked on her book, Bourgeois Radicals: The NAACP and the Struggle for Colonial Liberation, 1941–1960.

Career
Anderson worked as an associate professor of history at the University of Missouri in Columbia. She was awarded a fellowship for teaching excellence in 2001. In 2009, Anderson joined the faculty of the African American Studies department at Emory University in Atlanta, Georgia.

In an op-ed for The Washington Post in 2014, Anderson argued that the unrest following the 2014 Ferguson shooting was a manifestation of "white rage", or white backlash against African American advancement. The column was one of the most-read articles of the year, receiving thousands of comments, and Anderson was offered a book contract. The resulting book, White Rage: The Unspoken Truth of Our Racial Divide, expanded on the history of anti-black racism and retaliation in the United States.

White Rage became a New York Times Best Seller, and was listed as a notable book of 2016 by The New York Times, The Washington Post, The Boston Globe, and the Chicago Review of Books. White Rage was also listed by The New York Times as an Editors' Choice, and won the 2016 National Book Critics Circle Award for Criticism.

Anderson has discussed the historical context of voter suppression in relation to alleged intimidation of minority voters during the 2016 U.S. Presidential Election. She has also claimed that "white rage" was the reason for the election of Donald Trump.

Anderson has protested against human rights abuses of farm workers in Florida, in alliance with the Coalition of Immokalee Workers (CIW). She joined the CIW in calling for the supermarket chain Publix to join the Fair Food Program in response.

Anderson was a member of the Historical Advisory Committee of the U.S. Department of State.  She is on the Board of Directors of the National Economic & Social Rights Initiative (NESRI).

Anderson is featured in the 2019 documentary After Selma, directed by Loki Mulholland, where she describes the history and current state of voter suppression in the United States.

Anderson was named the American Academy of Political and Social Science's 2021 W. E. B. Dubois Fellow.

Selected publications

Selected awards and recognition
 2003 – Gustavus Myers Outstanding Book Award, Eyes Off the Prize
 2004 – Myrna F. Bernath Book Award, Eyes Off the Prize
 2016 – Politico 50
 2016 – Winner, National Book Critics Circle Award for Criticism, White Rage

References

Further reading

External links

20th-century American historians
21st-century American historians
Historians of African Americans
African-American historians
American women historians
American women academics
20th-century American women writers
21st-century American women writers
African-American non-fiction writers
University of Missouri faculty
Emory University faculty
Miami University alumni
Ohio State University Graduate School alumni
1959 births
Living people
20th-century African-American women writers
20th-century African-American writers
21st-century African-American women writers
21st-century African-American writers